Angel of Evil (also known as Vallanzasca - Angels of Evil) is a 2010 Italian crime film directed by Michele Placido. It is based on the biography Il fiore del male. Bandito a Milano (The flower of evil. Bandit in Milan) of bank robber Renato Vallanzasca, by Italian journalist Carlo Bonini.

Plot 
Locked up in prison serving a life sentence for his crimes, an old Renato Vallanzasca (Kim Rossi Stuart) proceeds in the memories of a youth spent as head of a crime syndicate known as the chronicle Banda della Comasina, which raged in the 1970s in Milan between robberies, kidnappings, murders and evasions.

Cast 
 Kim Rossi Stuart as Renato Vallanzasca
 Filippo Timi as Enzo
 Paz Vega as Antonella D'Agostino
 Moritz Bleibtreu as  Sergio
 Francesco Scianna as  Francis Turatello 
  as Carmen
  as Spaghettino
 Valeria Solarino as  Ripalta Pioggia, aka Consuelo
 Lino Guanciale: Nunzio
 Nicola Acunzo: Rosario
 : Fausto
 Paolo Mazzarelli: Beppe
 
 Gerardo Amato: Padre di Renato
 Lorenzo Gleijeses: Donato
 : Madre di Renato
 : Giuliana
 Stefano Chiodaroli: Armando
 Monica Bîrlădeanu as  Nicoletta
 Riccardo Leonelli: Bruno, portantino

Production 
In 2008, 20th Century Fox showed a project of Renato Vallanzasca's movie to Michele Placido, proposing him to direct it. The director, initially uninterested, accepted the job only after being approached by Kim Rossi Stuart, who wanted to play the role of the protagonist. Placido spoke for the first time about it in a January 2009 interview, in which he announced his plans for the future, directing Vallanzasca and two other films.

Release

Italy 
20th Century Fox has taken care of Italian cinema distribution. Before being confirmed as the distribution company, the producers had thought of Medusa Film and Rai Cinema, but neither were interested in film studies and rejected the script. On 12 July 2010, Michele Placido said in a press release about the film that both houses had refused the rights acquisition because of the "hypocritical respectability" in Italy.
Vallanzasca was originally planned to be theatrically released in Italy in October 2010, but 20th Century Fox delayed it a few months after, to 17 December.

U.S. 
The film was released in the United States in 2011 with the title Angel of Evil.

Reception
On Rotten Tomatoes, the film has a 52% rating based on reviews from 25 critics.

References

External links
 

2010 films
2010 crime films
2010 biographical drama films
2010s Italian-language films
French crime drama films
Romanian crime drama films
Italian biographical drama films
Films directed by Michele Placido
Biographical films about gangsters
Biographical films about Italian bandits
20th Century Fox films
Italian crime drama films
Romanian biographical drama films
French biographical drama films
2010s French films